The Golden Masters was a professional invitational snooker tournament held for two editions in Newtownards, Northern Ireland. Sponsored by McEwan's lager, both tournaments were won by Welsh players (Doug Mountjoy and Ray Reardon).

The tournament featured four professionals - Ray Reardon, Dennis Taylor, Doug Mountjoy and Graham Miles.

Winners

References

Snooker non-ranking competitions
Snooker competitions in Northern Ireland
Recurring sporting events established in 1978
Recurring sporting events disestablished in 1979
1978 establishments in Northern Ireland
Sport in Northern Ireland
Defunct snooker competitions
Defunct sports competitions in Northern Ireland
1979 disestablishments in Northern Ireland